Daal Chawal is a 2019 Pakistani romantic drama film, directed and produced by Awais Khalid and written by Akbar Nasir Khan. It has Momina Iqbal, Ahmed Sufiyan, Salman Shahid, Shafqat Cheema, Sakhawat Naz and Babar Khan in pivot roles. It released on 4 October 2019, by Hum Films and Eveready Pictures.

Plot
Pakistan police is working against a network of international terrorists in Lahore. Ahmed (Ahmed Sufiyan), a young unemployed man becomes a witness of suicide bombing incident and helps a Police officer Sonia (Momina Iqbal) to apprehend them.

Cast
Momina Iqbal as Sonia Khan
Ahmed Sufiyan as Ahmed
Mir Hamza as Habib
Shafqat Cheema as Bhola Pehlwan
Salman Shahid as Khalil Khiali
Babar Khan Inspector Akram
Ali Khan as Yousuf
Sakhawat Naz as Mirza Sahib
Saima Saleem as Chandni Begum
Sohail Tariq as professor
zain mughal as Terrorist

References

External links

2019 films
2019 romantic drama films
2010s Urdu-language films
Pakistani romantic drama films